This article lists lightvessels around the world. Most surviving light vessels reside in the United Kingdom and the United States. Some of the lightvessels mentioned in the lists have been renamed more than once, while others have been re-stationed or captured in war. Lightvessels were also not as permanent as a building or structure which helped lead to the replacement of others.

United Kingdom and Ireland

United States

Europe

Elsewhere

See also
Lists of lighthouses

References